Manuel Núñez may refer to:

Manuel Ángel Núñez Soto (born 1951), Mexican politician
Manuel Núñez Pérez (born 1933), Spanish politician
Manuel Núñez Tovar (1872–1928), Venezuelan naturalist

See also
Chema (footballer, born 1997), José Manuel Núñez Martín, Spanish footballer
Cristian Núñez (footballer, born 1980), Cristian Manuel Núñez, Argentine footballer
Dom Núñez (born 1995), Dominic Manuel Núñez, American baseball player
Manuela Nuñez de Almeida, 18th-century British Jewish poet
Xosé Manoel Núñez Seixas (born 1966), Spanish historian